Patrick James McCourt (born 16 December 1983) is a Northern Irish former footballer who played as a winger.

He started his professional career with Third Division club Rochdale in 2001 before moving to League of Ireland club Shamrock Rovers in 2005. Later that year he moved to his hometown club, Derry City, where he won the League of Ireland Cup three times in 2005, 2006 and 2007, and the FAI Cup in 2006. At Derry, he gained the nickname "The Derry Pelé" for his skilful play. In 2008 he signed for Scottish Premier League club Celtic; the club he supported as a boy. In a five-season spell there, he won the Scottish Cup in 2011 and 2013 and the SPL title in 2011–12 and 2012–13. Despite being a fan favourite at the club, he failed to gain a regular first-team place and was released in June 2013. 

McCourt then signed a one-year contract at Championship club Barnsley, though the club was relegated during the 2013–14 season and McCourt was released. He signed a one-year deal with Brighton & Hove Albion for the following campaign, but featured little and joined League One club Notts County on loan for the final third of the season. He left Brighton and in July 2015 signed for League Two club Luton Town on a two-year contract. He was released by mutual consent halfway through to enable him to return to Northern Ireland, where he signed a one-year contract with NIFL Premiership club Glenavon. He left by mutual agreement in December 2016, and the following March he signed for League of Ireland side Finn Harps, where he retired in 2018.

McCourt made his Northern Ireland international debut in 2002, but did not play again until 2009. He scored his first two goals against the Faroe Islands in 2011.

Early life
McCourt was born in Londonderry, Northern Ireland, and educated at Steelstown Primary School.

Club career

Rochdale
McCourt began his career with an early move from Derry-based youth club Foyle Harps to English Third Division club Rochdale on a youth contract in 2000. He made his first-team debut in the Football League Trophy on 16 October 2001 and his potential prompted his signing to the Spotland club on a three-and-a-half-year professional contract in December 2001. His first season ended with four goals in 23 appearances, and making 30 appearances in 2002–03. His skillful playing style attracted the attention of Premier League clubs Blackburn Rovers and Manchester City.

In the 2003–04 season, McCourt managed just a handful of starts for the club and had two spells away on trial with First Division clubs Norwich City and Crewe Alexandra, though neither club followed up their initial interest in him. A combination of injuries and loss of form hastened his departure from Rochdale in February 2005.

After Rochdale manager Steve Parkin informed him that he was to be released, McCourt headed for another trial, this time with Scottish Premier League outfit Motherwell. However, after two weeks at Fir Park a move failed to take place.

Shamrock Rovers
In March 2005, McCourt was signed by Roddy Collins, manager of League of Ireland club Shamrock Rovers. McCourt scored three goals in his first six appearances for the Dublin club and topped the goalscoring charts by May 2005. As the club ran into financial difficulty, mainly due to the costs surrounding the building of Tallaght Stadium, Rovers were forced to place all players except McCourt on the transfer list. After seven goals in 17 appearances, and following interest from Bristol City and Queens Park Rangers, the club, in dire need of funds, decided to sell McCourt. He was signed by his home-town club, Derry City, for a fee thought to be around £60,000. Despite leaving the club halfway through the season, McCourt was their top goalscorer that season and won the Professional Footballers Association of Ireland Young Player of the Year award.

Derry City
In his first few months at the club, McCourt helped Derry City to the League of Ireland Cup and runners-up in the league in 2005. In the 2006 season, he played in Derry's UEFA Cup run, in which the club eventually lost to French giants Paris Saint-Germain, and helped them to win a cup double with victories in both the FAI Cup and League of Ireland Cup finals. McCourt scored four goals in 25 appearances in the 2007 season and won a third League of Ireland Cup medal. His performances interested English club West Bromwich Albion and Derry announced in June 2008 that they had reached an agreement with the newly promoted Premier League club. However, Derry also agreed a fee with Scottish Premier League club Celtic, leaving McCourt to make his choice.

Celtic

The lure of joining Celtic, the club he had supported as a boy, persuaded McCourt to move to Glasgow and, on 19 June 2008, he signed for a fee of £200,000 after agreeing a three-year contract. The manager who signed him, Gordon Strachan, would later claim that McCourt was "as gifted a footballer as I have ever seen."

McCourt made his competitive debut for Celtic on 25 October 2008 in a 4–2 win over Hibernian. In his first season, he featured primarily for the Celtic reserve team, playing in the deciding game on 28 April 2009 against Rangers reserves to clinch the Reserve League title for the eighth season in succession.

On 23 September 2009, McCourt opened his goalscoring account for Celtic with a memorable goal in a League Cup match at Falkirk, in which he beat five defenders before chipping the ball over goalkeeper Bobby Olejnik. He then scored his first Scottish Premier League goal on his first league start three days later against St Mirren, which saw him go past six defenders before beating the goalkeeper. On 24 January 2010, McCourt bagged his second league goal for Celtic against St Johnstone after a mazy run and finish into the top right hand corner, from just inside the penalty box. Premier League newcomers Blackpool expressed an interest in McCourt following his performances throughout the 2009–10 season, prompting Celtic to offer him an improved contract, which he duly signed.

In the first game of the 2010–11 season, McCourt scored the only goal of the game against newly promoted Inverness Caledonian Thistle with a now-typical solo run and shot, beating three defenders and then netting from the edge of the box. He scored his second goal of the season, his first at Celtic Park in Celtic's 3–0 victory over Hearts on 11 September 2010, beating three players before chipping the goalkeeper. On 6 November 2010, McCourt netted the final goal of Celtic's 9–0 demolition of Aberdeen. Later that month, he scored Celtic's 600th home SPL goal in a 2–2 draw with Inverness at Celtic Park, with another jinking run and precise finish. On 29 December 2010, McCourt scored the winning goal in a 1–0 win over Motherwell. On 26 January 2011, McCourt added another SPL goal in a 4–0 win over Hearts. He came on as a substitute in the 2011 Scottish Cup Final on 21 May 2011, a 3–0 win over Motherwell, to win his first silverware in Scotland. In August 2011, it was reported that Liverpool was interested in signing McCourt.

McCourt was mainly used as a late substitute over the course of the next two seasons, failing to score a single goal, though he was part of the Celtic team that won both the 2011–12 and 2012–13 SPL titles, as well as the 2013 Scottish Cup. In the final at Hampden Park, a 3–0 victory over Hibernian, he entered play as a substitute and was handed the captain's armband in what proved to be his final appearance for the club. McCourt left Celtic after his contract expired in June 2013, having played in a total of 88 games, scoring ten goals. On 6 August 2013, he began training with Hibernian to try and win a contract, but no move materialised.

Barnsley
On 22 August 2013, McCourt signed for Championship club Barnsley, managed by his former Rochdale teammate David Flitcroft, on a one-year deal. He made his debut on 21 September 2013 at home to Watford. He played in 23 league games for the club, scoring twice, before being released at the end of the season. One goal, which opened the scoring in Barnsley's 3–2 victory over Middlesbrough, saw McCourt guide the ball into the box and take out six opposition players, before finishing past the goalkeeper from the six-yard line. The goal was shortlisted for the Football League Goal of the Year award, though lost to Franck Moussa's chip for Coventry City against Leyton Orient.

Brighton & Hove Albion
On 19 August 2014, McCourt signed a one-year contract with Championship club Brighton & Hove Albion. He found his playing time limited and subsequently joined Notts County on loan on 21 February 2015 until the end of the 2014–15 season. McCourt made 12 appearances for the club and scored once.

In April 2015, Brighton confirmed that McCourt, who made 13 appearances for the club during the 2014–15 season would not be offered a new contract.

Luton Town
On 1 July 2015, McCourt joined League Two club Luton Town on a two-year contract.

McCourt made 25 appearances, scoring one goal during the 2015–16 season, but was released from his contract one year early on 24 May 2016 to enable him to return to Northern Ireland.

Glenavon
McCourt signed a one-year contract with NIFL Premiership club Glenavon on 19 July 2016. He made his home debut on 30 July 2016 as Glenavon earned a 1–0 win over Crusaders to win the NIFL Charity Shield. His league debut came one week later in a 4–0 home win over Carrick Rangers on the opening day of the 2016–17 season, but was substituted in the 43rd-minute due to an injury. On 21 December, McCourt came to a mutual agreement with Glenavon to terminate his contract, after struggling to adapt to part-time football.

Finn Harps
McCourt signed for League of Ireland Premier Division club Finn Harps on 21 February 2017. He debuted three days later as a 69th-minute substitute in a 1–0 defeat at home to Cork City. McCourt scored his first goal for Finn Harps in a 3–2 defeat away to former club Shamrock Rovers on 31 March.

Following a restructure of the League of Ireland divisions, Finn Harps suffered relegation in 2017, despite finishing in the normal play-off places. McCourt committed his future to Harps however, and signed on for the 2018 First Division season.

In June 2018, it was announced that McCourt would retire from playing at the end of the season to take up a role as head of youth structures at Derry City. He pledged to go out on a high and did so by helping Harps to promotion back to the Premier Division for the 2019 season.

International career
McCourt represented Northern Ireland at senior international level. He has also received nine caps for the Northern Ireland under-21s between 2002 and 2005 while playing for Rochdale and played once for the Northern Ireland B team while in the Celtic reserve team.

In April 2002, Northern Ireland manager Sammy McIlroy handed McCourt his senior international debut against Spain in a friendly at Windsor Park, which his team lost 5–0.

He had an almost-seven year wait for his second cap, which came in February 2009 against San Marino in a qualifying match for the 2010 World Cup. Northern Ireland won the game 3–0. Following his breakthrough 2010–11 season at Celtic, McCourt was named in a number of Northern Ireland squads, primarily playing as a substitute.

He scored his first international goals with two solo efforts, as he helped Northern Ireland to a 4–0 victory over the Faroe Islands in a 2012 European Championship qualification match on 10 August 2011. The second goal, which saw him dribble the ball for 40 yards past four players and finish with a close-range chip over the opposition goalkeeper, was described by the Belfast Telegraph as "one of the best ever witnessed" for Northern Ireland.

Style of play
McCourt is known for his technical ability and propensity for scoring "wonder goals". At Derry, he gained the nickname "The Derry Pelé" for his skillful play and is often referred to by his previous clubs' fans as a "cult hero" for his crowd-pleasing displays.

Personal life
McCourt has two older brothers; Harry and Leroy. Harry also played for Derry City and was joint-top scorer in the Irish League during the 1991–92 season while playing for Omagh Town. He also won the 1997–98 Irish League with Cliftonville and now serves as a director at Derry. Leroy has previously worked as a scout for various English and Scottish clubs and is a FIFA registered football agent; his brother Paddy being one of his clients.

On 12 January 2011, bullets were sent in the post to McCourt (i.e. a death threat) from an address in Northern Ireland. Celtic manager Neil Lennon and teammate Niall McGinn were sent similar packages earlier in the same week.

On 23 February 2022, McCourt appeared in court to face charges of sexual assault against him from an alleged incident on 30 January. McCourt denied all charges and was released on bail.

Career statistics

Club

International

International goals
As of match played 13 November 2015. Northern Ireland score listed first, score column indicates score after each McCourt goal.

Honours

Club
Derry City
League of Ireland Premier Division runner-up (2): 2005, 2006
FAI Cup (1): 2006
League of Ireland Cup (3): 2005, 2006, 2007

Celtic
Scottish Premier League runner-up (3): 2008–09, 2009–10, 2010–11
Scottish Premier League (2): 2011–12, 2012–13
Scottish League Cup (1): 2009
Scottish League Cup runner-up (2): 2011, 2012
Scottish Cup (2): 2011, 2013

Glenavon
NIFL Charity Shield: 2016–17

Individual
PFAI Young Player of the Year (1): 2005
League of Ireland Premier Division Player of the Month (1): June 2006

References

External links

1983 births
Living people
Sportspeople from Derry (city)
Northern Ireland under-21 international footballers
Northern Ireland B international footballers
Northern Ireland international footballers
Association football wingers
Association footballers from Northern Ireland
Rochdale A.F.C. players
Shamrock Rovers F.C. players
Derry City F.C. players
Celtic F.C. players
Barnsley F.C. players
Brighton & Hove Albion F.C. players
Notts County F.C. players
Luton Town F.C. players
Glenavon F.C. players
Finn Harps F.C. players
English Football League players
League of Ireland players
Scottish Premier League players
People charged with sex crimes